Ray Belton is an American academic administrator. He serves as the president-chancellor of Southern University, a historically black public university in Baton Rouge, Louisiana.

Early life
Belton graduated from Southern University, where he earned a bachelor's degree. He earned a master's degree in counseling from the University of Nebraska and a Ph.D. in educational administration from the University of Texas at Austin.

Career
Belton began his career in academia as an assistant professor at his alma mater, Southern University.

Belton served as the chancellor of the Southern University at Shreveport from 2000 to 2015. Under his leadership, "enrollment [...] increased by 156 percent and graduation rates have doubled."

Since 2015, Belton has served as the president-chancellor of Southern University in Baton Rouge.

Personal life
Belton is married to Norma Belton.

References

Living people
Southern University alumni
University of Nebraska alumni
University of Texas at Austin College of Education alumni
Southern University presidents
African-American academics
Year of birth missing (living people)
21st-century African-American people